Alfred Ernest Ind VC (16 September 1872 – 29 November 1916) was an English recipient of the Victoria Cross, the highest and most prestigious award for gallantry in the face of the enemy that can be awarded to British and Commonwealth forces.

Ind was 29 years old, and a Shoeing Smith in X 1 Section Pompoms, Royal Horse Artillery, British Army during the Second Boer War when the following deed took place at Tafelkop, Orange River Colony, South Africa, for which he was awarded the VC.

He later achieved the rank of Sergeant and was a member of the Chestnut Troop. He is buried in the churchyard of Eccleston Church near Eaton Hall, Cheshire.

References

Monuments to Courage (David Harvey, 1999)
The Register of the Victoria Cross (This England, 1997)
Victoria Crosses of the Anglo-Boer War (Ian Uys, 2000)

External links
Location of grave and VC medal (Cheshire)

angloboerwar.com

British recipients of the Victoria Cross
Second Boer War recipients of the Victoria Cross
Royal Horse Artillery soldiers
People from Tetbury
1872 births
1916 deaths
British Army personnel of the Second Boer War
British Army recipients of the Victoria Cross
Military personnel from Gloucestershire
Burials in Cheshire